Liangshan County is a county situated in the southwest of Shandong province, China. It is administered by the prefecture-level city of Jining.

Geography
Liangshan County is situated north west of Jining in the south west of Shandong province.  To the east it borders the prefecture-level cities of Tai'an, Heze to the west. To the north, the Yellow River separates Liangshan from Puyang, in Henan province.

Climate

History
The area was from prehistoric times surrounded by the largest marshland in north China, called the Daye Marsh and later the Liangshan Marsh. Because the area was largely a wasteland on the frontiers of several administrative units, government control was minimal, and bandit chiefs were active in the area. During the Song Dynasty Liang Shan (Mount Liang) became known as the "eight hundred li moorage of Mount Liang" and  located at the extreme north of the Yellow River which passed through the area.   When the Yellow River shifted course in 1289, the marshes of Liangshan shrunk considerably. During the Ming Dynasty it had been reduced to five smaller marshlands. Banditry continued on Mount Liang until the mid-seventeenth century, when the Qing Dynasty government established a military garrison.  The city of Liangshan evolved from the garrison. After the Yellow River shifted back to its northern course in 1853, the marshes were gradually filled in by sediments carried downstream by the river and human land reclamation. Today the relatively small Dongping Lake() is what remains of the great marshes.

Administrative divisions
As 2012, this county is divided to 9 towns and 4 townships.
Towns

Townships

Tourism
The famous mountain Mount Liang (Liáng Shān) rises to 197.9 m above sea level is located within Liangshan County administrative territory.  It is well known as the stronghold of the 108 legendary Song Dynasty heroes of the classic Chinese novel the Water Margin.

Transportation
China National Highway 220

References

 http://www.cfguide.com/county/Liangshan.htm
 https://web.archive.org/web/20170819191901/http://www.liangshan.gov.cn/index.aspx?lanmuid=40&sublanmuid=438

Water Margin
Counties of Shandong
Jining